Meta Berger ( Schlichting; February 23, 1873 – June 16, 1944) was a prominent female socialist organizer in Milwaukee, Wisconsin, and advocate for improved public schooling systems. She was also the wife of the prominent democratic socialist politician Victor L. Berger.

Biography

Early years

Meta Schlichting was born in Milwaukee, Wisconsin to parents from Germany on February 23, 1873. She was educated at the Wisconsin State Normal School (now the University of Wisconsin–Milwaukee). She taught primary school for three years before resigning in 1897 to marry Victor Berger.

Political career

In 1909, Berger was elected to the Milwaukee school board.  As a school board member, she supported progressive measures such as the construction of playgrounds, "penny lunches" and medical exams for children. She also advocated on behalf of teachers, working for tenure, a fixed-salary schedule and a pension system. Re-elected in 1915, Berger won three more times, serving a total of 30 years.

In 1917, Berger joined the Milwaukee Emergency Peace Committee, a group that tried to prevent U.S. Navy recruiters from targeting schoolchildren.

Her work for the school board led to her appointments to the Wisconsin State Board of Education, the Wisconsin Board of Regents of Normal Schools, and University of Wisconsin Board of Regents.

The Bergers spent much of the 1920s traveling in Asia and Germany. After her husband's death in 1929, Berger remained on the school board until 1939, and was considered a potential candidate for vice-president in the Socialist Party in 1932. However, Berger left the Socialist Party in 1940 because of her involvement in communist organizations.

Death and legacy
She died at her Thiensville farm on June 16, 1944, aged 71. She is interred in Forest Home Cemetery in Milwaukee.

References

Further reading
 Berger, Meta S. and Kimberly Swanson. A Milwaukee Woman's Life on the Left: The Autobiography of Meta Berger. Madison: State Historical Society of Wisconsin, 2001.
 Berger, Victor L. and Meta S. Berger. The Family Letters of Victor and Meta Berger, 1894-1929. Michael E. Stevens with Ellen D. Goldlust-Gingrich, eds. Madison: Center for Documentary History, State Historical Society of Wisconsin, 1995.

External links 
 Meta Berger | Wisconsin Historical Society

1873 births
1944 deaths
American people of German descent
American anti–World War I activists
Politicians from Milwaukee
School board members in Wisconsin
Socialist Party of America politicians from Wisconsin
Women in Wisconsin politics
People from Thiensville, Wisconsin